Cymindis setifeensis is a species of ground beetle in the subfamily Harpalinae. It was described by Hippolyte Lucas in 1842.

References

setifeensis
Beetles described in 1842